Transtillaspis nedyma is a species of moth of the family Tortricidae. It is found in Ecuador in Napo and Zamora-Chinchipe provinces.

The wingspan is 19-20.5 mm. The ground colour of the forewings is ochreous with an orange hue and tinged with grey in the tornal and terminal parts of the wing. The hindwings are greyish brown, but paler basally and with an ochreous anal portion.

Etymology
The species name refers to the appearance of the species and is derived from Greek nedymos (meaning nice).

References

Moths described in 2005
Transtillaspis
Moths of South America
Taxa named by Józef Razowski